Jonathan Howard (born 7 October 1971) is a footballer who played in The Football League for Chesterfield and Rotherham United and was part of the Chesterfield FC side which enjoyed a famous FA Cup run during the 1996-97 football campaign.

Career
Howard started his career at Rotherham United scoring 5 goals in 36 league games for the Millers. He joined Chesterfield in 1994 and went on to amass over 230 appearances for the club in over nine years. During his time with the Spireites, Howard was involved in the famous FA Cup run in the 1996–97 season which saw Chesterfield reach the semi-finals of the competition. He scored a brace as they knocked out Bristol City in the third round, and went on to win the decisive penalty which teammate Tom Curtis tucked away against Nottingham Forest in the fifth round of the competition. He also found himself at the centre of controversy when, in the semi-final which saw the Spireites up against Middlesbrough F.C at Old Trafford, he took a shot which hit the underside of the crossbar and appeared to cross the line and yet the goal was never given. Had it been awarded as a goal it would have put Chesterfield 3-1 up against 10 man Middlesbrough (after the earlier dismissal of Vladimír Kinder) with just over 20 minutes remaining. As it was, Middlesbrough equalised to make it 2-2 after 90 minutes, it finished 3-3 after extra time and Chesterfield lost the replay 3–0. Ironically, both the Forest and Middlesbrough games were refereed by David Elleray. He finished his career with Burton Albion.

Howard now works at Scout7, having had a brief spell back in the game with non-league outfits, Maltby Main and Dinnington Town.

References

External links

English footballers
Chesterfield F.C. players
Buxton F.C. players
Rotherham United F.C. players
Burton Albion F.C. players
Dinnington Town F.C. players
English Football League players
1971 births
Living people
Association football goalkeepers